Crystal Express is a collection of science fiction and  fantasy stories by American author Bruce Sterling.  It was released in 1989  by Arkham House.  It was initially published in an edition of 4,231 copies and was the author's first book published by Arkham House.

Many of the stories appeared in Isaac Asimov's Science Fiction Magazine and The Magazine of Fantasy and Science Fiction, and the first five stories are set in Sterling's Shaper/Mechanist universe.

Contents

Crystal Express contains the following stories:

 "Swarm"
 "Spider Rose"
 "Cicada Queen"
 "Sunken Gardens"
 "Twenty Evocations"
 "Green Days in Brunei"
 "Spook"
 "The Beautiful and the Sublime"
 "Telliamed"
 "The Little Magic Shop"
 "Flowers of Edo"
 "Dinner in Audoghast"

Sources

1989 short story collections
Science fiction short story collections
Fantasy short story collections